Streptomyces incanus is a bacterium species from the genus of Streptomyces which has been isolated from soil of a hay meadow from the Cockle Park Experimental Farm in Northumberland in the United Kingdom.

See also 
 List of Streptomyces species

References

Further reading

External links
Type strain of Streptomyces incanus at BacDive -  the Bacterial Diversity Metadatabase

incanus
Bacteria described in 2012